ZERO is a Moroccan film written and directed by Nour-Eddine Lakhmari and produced by Timlif Productions, released on December 19, 2012, in Morocco. The film was a box office success in Morocco. It was screened at a number of international film festivals, and took away the Grand Prize at the Tangier National Film Festival, among other prizes.

Synopsis 
Amine Bertale aka "Zero", is an insecure, alcoholic cop who spends most of his time taking statements from complainants or wandering the streets and bars of Casablanca alongside Mimi, a 22 year old prostitute.

Cast 

 Younes Bouab (Amine Bertale aka ZERO)
 Mohamed Majd (Abbas, Amine's father)
 Saïd Bey (Boufertatou)
 Zineb Samara (Mimi)
 Aziz Dadas (Chief Zerouali)
 Malika Hamaoui (Aïcha Baïdou)
 Ouidad Elma (Nadia Baïdou)

Awards and accolades 

 Grand Prize (Tangier National Film Festival)

References

External links 
 

2012 films
Moroccan drama films
2010s Arabic-language films
2012 drama films